

See also
Comparison of Colorado ski resorts
Comparison of New Mexico ski resorts
Comparison of North American ski resorts
List of ski areas and resorts in the United States

References

Ski Resorts Comparison
 
California